The Hungarian National Council of Transylvania is a civic organization that represents the ethnic Hungarians of Romania. Established in 2003, its chairman is László Tőkés. The organisation intends to present, represent and move the case of Hungarian autonomy in Transylvania. 

In 2009, the coalition between UDMR and Hungarian National Council of Transylvania resulted in nine percent of the votes in the European Parliamentary elections which meant three Romanian EP seats.

References

Hungarian organizations in Romania
2003 establishments in Romania